The Capital Curling Fall Open (known as the Moosehead Fall Open for sponsorship reasons) is an annual bonspiel on the men's Ontario Curling Tour. It is held annually in September at the RCMP Curling Club in Ottawa, Ontario. A women's event was held from 2010 to 2013, and women have participated in the men's event in other years.

Past Champions

Men

Women

Past Open event Champions
(Open to both genders)

External links
Official site

Ontario Curling Tour events
Curling in Ottawa